"All the Way Home" is a song by American R&B recording artist Tamar Braxton.  It was released as the third single on August 21, 2013 from her second studio album Love and War (2013). Written by Harvey Mason Jr., Damon Thomas, Michael Daley, Sevyn Streeter, Joelle James, Steven "Lil Steve" Russell and produced by The Underdogs.

Music video
The music video premiered on 106 & Park and on Braxton's VEVO account on December 4, 2013 with her then-husband Vincent Herbert featuring in the video.

Commercial reception
"All the Way Home" debuted at number 96 on the Billboard Hot 100 chart, number 9 on Billboard R&B Streaming Songs chart, number 11 on the Heatseekers Songs chart and number 32 on Billboard Hot R&B/Hip-Hop Songs chart on December 21, 2013. "All The Way Home" peaked at number 19 on Hot R&B/Hip-Hop Airplay chart on February 8, 2014. "All The Way Home" also peaked at number 8 on Adult R&B Songs chart on February 15, 2014.

Charts

Release history

References

Tamar Braxton songs
2013 singles
2013 songs
Songs written by Harvey Mason Jr.
Songs written by Damon Thomas (record producer)
Songs written by Sevyn Streeter
Epic Records singles
Song recordings produced by the Underdogs (production team)
2010s ballads
Contemporary R&B ballads
Soul ballads